Procloeon rubropictum is a species of small minnow mayfly in the family Baetidae. It is found in the south half of Canada and the eastern United States.

References

Further reading

 

Mayflies
Insects described in 1923